Leontiy Vasilievich Dubbelt (1792–1862) was a Russian soldier (1807-1828) and subsequently a police-chief under Emperor  Nicholas I. Dubelt fought at the Battle of Borodino in 1812 and briefly came under suspicion of involvement in the Decembrist conspiracy of 1825. He held senior rank from 1839 to 1856 in the feared Third Section and was directly involved in  secret-service cases involving writers and intellectuals such as Pushkin, Lermontov, Saltykov-Shchedrin and Turgenev.

References

Russian soldiers
1792 births
1862 deaths